The 2008 WNBA season was the first for the Atlanta Dream. The team name was unveiled on January 23, 2008, with the expansion draft held on February 6. The Atlanta Dream had seventeen straight losses. It was the longest losing streak to start a season in WNBA history.

Transactions

Expansion Draft
The list of players selected in the Expansion Draft includes:

Additionally, Atlanta immediately orchestrated three trades involving players in the expansion draft.

WNBA Draft

Trades and Roster Changes

Roster
{| class="toccolours" style="font-size: 95%; width: 100%;"
|-
! colspan="2" style="background:#6495ED;color:white;"|2008 Atlanta Dream Roster
|- style="text-align:center; background-color:#FF0000; color:#FFFFFF;"
! Players !! Coaches
|- 
| valign="top" |
{| class="sortable" style="background:transparent; margin:0px; width:100%;"
! Pos. !! # !! Nat. !! Name !! Ht. !! Wt. !! From
|-

Depth

Schedule

Preseason

|- align="center" bgcolor="ffbbbb"
| 1
| May 3
| Los Angeles
| L 80-86
| Thomas, Young (15)
| Young (5)
| Ingram (4)
| Philips Arena  7,932
| 0-1
|- align="center" bgcolor="ffbbbb"
| 2
| May 11
| @ Phoenix
| L 84-97
| Lennox (21)
| Lovelace (6)
| Haynie, Lennox (4)
| US Airways Center  1,845
| 0-2
|-

Regular season
The Atlanta Dream lost their first game in franchise history, 67-100. Their opponent was the Connecticut Sun; the Sun delivered a 32-8 run that stretched into the second quarter to open a 17-point lead. The lead exploded to 34 points. At the conclusion of the game, the Dream were outrebounded 53-29. For the Dream, Stacey Lovelace had 11 points, five assists and four rebounds.

|- bgcolor="ffbbbb"
| 1
| May 17
| @ Connecticut
| 67-100
| Lennox (17)
| Haynie, Lennox (7)
| Lovelace (5)
| Mohegan Sun Arena  7,420
| 0-1
|- bgcolor="ffbbbb"
| 2
| May 23
| Detroit
| 76-88
| Lennox (21)
| de Souza (18)
| Latta (3)
| Philips Arena  11,609
| 0-2
|- bgcolor="ffbbbb"
| 3
| May 25
| Los Angeles
| 56-74
| Castro Marques (17)
| de Souza, Feenstra (6)
| Haynie, Latta (4)
| Philips Arena  11,186
| 0-3
|- bgcolor="ffbbbb"
| 4
| May 27
| @ Washington
| 74-80
| Lennox (29)
| de Souza, Lennox, Little, Lovelace (3)
| Latta (6)
| Verizon Center  6,231
| 0-4
|-

|- bgcolor="ffbbbb"
| 5
| June 3
| Minnesota
| 81-85
| Lennox (28)
| Feenstra (9)
| Lennox (8)
| Philips Arena  5,844
| 0-5
|- bgcolor="ffbbbb"
| 6
| June 6
| Chicago
| 72-86
| Latta (17)
| Little (7)
| Latta, Lennox (5)
| Philips Arena  7,418
| 0-6
|- bgcolor="ffbbbb"
| 7
| June 7
| @ Chicago
| 70-91
| Lacy (18)
| Lacy (10)
| Lennox (4)
| UIC Pavilion  3,182
| 0-7
|- bgcolor="ffbbbb"
| 8
| June 11
| New York
| 77-81
| Lennox (28)
| Lennox (7)
| Latta (6)
| Philips Arena  5,936
| 0-8
|- bgcolor="ffbbbb"
| 9
| June 13
| Indiana
| 67-76
| Young, Latta (14)
| Lacy, Young (5)
| Latta (6)
| Philips Arena  8,167
| 0-9
|- bgcolor="ffbbbb"
| 10
| June 16
| @ Houston
| 79-88
| Lennox (29)
| Lennox (11)
| Young (3)
| Reliant Arena  6,139
| 0-10
|- bgcolor="ffbbbb"
| 11
| June 18
| San Antonio
| 66-81
| Lovelace (18)
| Young (13)
| Young (7)
| Philips Arena  6,225
| 0-11
|- bgcolor="ffbbbb"
| 12
| June 20
| @ Washington
| 61-72
| Lennox (18)
| Lennox (9)
| Latta (4)
| Verizon Center  7,448
| 0-12
|- bgcolor="ffbbbb"
| 13
| June 22
| Detroit
| 76-97
| Latta (26)
| Young (11)
| Latta (10)
| Philips Arena  7,865
| 0-13
|- bgcolor="ffbbbb"
| 14
| June 27
| @ Connecticut
| 101-109 (OT)
| Lennox (44)
| Lennox (9)
| Lennox (7)
| Mohegan Sun Arena  7,612
| 0-14
|- bgcolor="ffbbbb"
| 15
| June 29
| @ Detroit
| 92-100
| Young (26)
| Lennox (8)
| Latta (5)
| Palace of Auburn Hills  8,798
| 0-15
|-

|- bgcolor="ffbbbb"
| 16
| July 1
| Phoenix
| 79-97
| Lennox (18)
| Lovelace, Young (7)
| Latta (5)
| Philips Arena  9,795
| 0-16
|- bgcolor="ffbbbb"
| 17
| July 3
| Houston
| 65-72
| Lennox (15)
| Feenstra (9)
| Haynie, Strother (3)
| Philips Arena  7,430
| 0-17
|- bgcolor="bbffbb"
| 18
| July 5
| Chicago
| 91-84
| Lacy, Latta (18)
| Young (8)
| Haynie (11)
| Philips Arena  8,468
| 1-17
|- bgcolor="bbffbb"
| 19
| July 9
| @ Minnesota
| 73-67
| Lennox (24)
| Bales (11)
| Haynie (5)
| Target Center  5,893
| 2-17
|- bgcolor="ffbbbb"
| 20
| July 11
| @ San Antonio
| 74-82
| Lennox (22)
| Bales (9)
| Lennox (4)
| AT&T Center  10,943
| 2-18
|- bgcolor="ffbbbb"
| 21
| July 13
| @ Chicago
| 66-79
| Feenstra (21)
| Feenstra (8)
| Feenstra, Haynie, Lennox (2)
| UIC Pavilion  2,907
| 2-19
|- bgcolor="bbffbb"
| 22
| July 16
| @ Indiana
| 81-77
| Castro Marques (24)
| Bales (11)
| Haynie (7)
| Conseco Fieldhouse  9,303
| 3-19
|- bgcolor="ffbbbb"
| 23
| July 18
| @ Sacramento
| 73-77
| Haynie (12)
| Feenstra (8)
| Haynie (4)
| ARCO Arena  7,236
| 3-20
|- bgcolor="ffbbbb"
| 24
| July 19
| @ Phoenix
| 84-110
| Latta (18)
| Terry (11)
| Latta (3)
| US Airways Center  7,913
| 3-21
|- bgcolor="ffbbbb"
| 25
| July 22
| Sacramento
| 66-79
| Terry, Latta (15)
| Terry (9)
| Haynie (4)
| Philips Arena  10,431
| 3-22
|- bgcolor="ffbbbb"
| 26
| July 25
| Washington
| 75-81
| Castro Marques (23)
| Bales (7)
| Haynie (3)
| Philips Arena  8,279
| 3-23
|- bgcolor="ffbbbb"
| 27
| July 27
| New York
| 76-86
| Lennox (18)
| de Souza (11)
| Latta (5)
| Philips Arena  8,759
| 3-24
|-

|-
| colspan="9" align="center" valign="middle" | Summer Olympic break
|- bgcolor="ffbbbb"
| 28
| August 29
| Connecticut
| 72-98
| Lennox (19)
| de Souza, Feenstra (6)
| Haynie (6)
| Philips Arena  11,442
| 3-25
|- bgcolor="ffbbbb"
| 29
| August 30
| @ Indiana
| 72-87
| Lennox (27)
| Bales (5)
| Haynie (5)
| Conseco Fieldhouse  9,280
| 3-26
|-

|- bgcolor="ffbbbb"
| 30
| September 2
| Seattle
| 69-83
| Lennox (25)
| de Souza (8)
| Latta (4)
| Philips Arena  7,390
| 3-27
|- bgcolor="ffbbbb"
| 31
| September 5
| @ New York
| 71-82
| Lennox (28)
| Lennox (7)
| Castro Marques (4)
| Madison Square Garden  7,039
| 3-28
|- bgcolor="ffbbbb"
| 32
| September 8
| Indiana
| 77-81
| Lennox (19)
| Bales (9)
| Castro Marques (6)
| Philips Arena  7,706
| 3-29
|- bgcolor="bbffbb"
| 33
| September 11
| @ Los Angeles
| 83-72
| Castro Marques (23)
| Bales (9)
| Latta (10)
| Staples Center  9,060
| 4-29
|- bgcolor="ffbbbb"
| 34
| September 12
| @ Seattle
| 72-77
| Young (20)
| Feenstra, Haynie, Terry (5)
| Latta (4)
| KeyArena  9,686
| 4-30
|-

Standings

Statistics

Regular Season

References

Atlanta
Atlanta Dream seasons
Atlanta Dream